Philipp Schenk (born 3 or 14 December 1914; date of death unknown) was a German ice hockey player who competed for the German national team at the 1936 Winter Olympics in Garmisch-Partenkirchen. He played club hockey for SC Riessersee.

References

1914 births
Year of death missing
German ice hockey centres
Ice hockey players at the 1936 Winter Olympics
Olympic ice hockey players of Germany
Sportspeople from Munich